Vilanovense Futebol Clube is a Portuguese football club based in Vila Nova de Gaia, Porto District. Their traditional kit consists in a striped black and red jersey, black shorts as well as black socks. An historic team from the Porto FA, they extinguished  their senior football team due to financial debt. A new team Vila FC was created in 2010 to continue the club's traditions.

In the higher national division, one of the participation was the Terceira Divisão which was in the 1993–94 season (13th, 34 pts) and again in the 1994–95 season.

Season to season

Honours
 Campeão Distrital da Segunda Divisão da A. F. Porto:
1942/43, 1953/54
 Campeão Distrital da Primeira Divisão da A. F. Porto and Campeão Distrital da Divisão de Honra da A. F. Porto:
1964/65, 1970/71, 1987/88, 1992/93
 Taça de Honra do Porto: 1
 1967–68

References

External links
 Official website
 Zerozero team profile
 VilanovenseBlog 
 A blog by Benjamins do Vilanovense 2010/2011 

Football clubs in Portugal
Association football clubs established in 1914
1914 establishments in Portugal